Chloe Lewis may refer to:

 Chloe Lewis (ER), character on American fictional TV series, ER
Chloe Lewis (TOWIE), participant in British semi-scripted reality series, The Only Way is Essex
Chloe Lewis, musician formerly in The Morning Of
Chloe Lewis (figure skater), 2016 Youth Olympic silver medalist in ice dancing